Daniel Schwaab (born 23 August 1988) is a German former professional footballer who played as a centre-back. He represented Germany at U18, U19, and U21 levels, winning the 2009 UEFA European Under-21 Championship.

Club career

SC Freiburg
Born in Waldkirch, West Germany, Schwaab began his career at hometown club SV Waldkirch, having begun playing football when he was four years old. One day, Schwaab went on trial at SC Freiburg in 2000 and quickly impressed the club's management that they signed him. While progressing in the club's youth teams, he initially played as a midfielder before converting to a centre-back. In the summer of 2006, Schwaab signed his first professional contract with SC Freiburg, where the club was playing in the 2. Bundesliga at the time, and was also promoted to the first team as well.

On 17 September 2006, Schwaab made his Freiburg debut, starting in the right-back position and playing for 79 minutes, as Freiburg drew 1–1 against 1860 Munich. After making his debut, he established himself in the starting eleven at the club, playing in the right–back position. Schwaab also began rotating in playing in different positions, including once playing in the midfield position. He helped SC Freiburg keep three clean sheets in three matches between 4 February 2007 and 19 February 2007. Schwaab, once again, helped the club keep three clean sheets in three matches between 1 April 2007 and 15 April 2007. At the end of the 2006-07 season, which saw SC Freiburg finish in fourth place, resulting in them missing out on promotion to the Bundesliga, he went on to make thirty–two appearances in all competitions.

At the start of the 2007–08 season, Schwaab continued to establish himself in the first team, playing in the right–back position. At times, he rotated in playing either in the centre–back position and left–back position. Between 7 March 2008 and 13 April 2008, Schwaab helped SC Freiburg keep four clean sheets out of the six matches. Since the start of the 2007–08 season, he started in every match for the club until missing one match against TuS Koblenz on 16 April 2008, due to undisclosed absent. But Schwaab made his return to the starting line–up against Greuther Fürth on 28 April 2008 and started the whole game, as SC Freiburg won 3–2. However, his return was short–lived when he suffered an injury and was sidelined for the remaining matches of the 2007–08 season. At the end of the 2007–08 season, Schwaab went on to make thirty–three appearances in all competitions.

At the start of the 2008–09 season, Schwaab started the season when he helped SC Freiburg make a perfect start to the season, earning thirteen points in the first five league matches. Schwaab then scored his first goal for the club, in a 3–1 win over Augsburg on 14 September 2008. This was followed up by setting up two goals for Mohammadou Idrissou, who went on to score a hat–trick, in a 5–0 win over Wehen Wiesbaden on 21 September 2008. Three days later on 24 September 2008, he scored his second goal for SC Freiburg, in a 3–1 win over 1899 Hoffenheim in the second round of the DFB-Pokal. Since the start of the 2008–09 season, Schwaab continued to establish himself in the first team, playing in the right–back position. Along the way, he scored two more goals, coming against FSV Frankfurt and VfL Osnabrück. However, Schwaab missed one match against Wehen Wiesbaden on 27 February 2009 after picking up five yellow cards this season; up until his suspension, he was an ever-present player, starting in every league match. After serving a one match suspension, Schwaab returned to the starting line–up against Alemannia Aachen on 8 March 2009 and helped the club win 2–1. He then scored his fifth goal of the season, as well as, setting up a goal for Tommy Bechmann, who scored twice in the game, in a 4=1 win against FSV Frankfurt. In a follow–up match against TuS Koblenz, he started the whole game and helped SC Freiburg win 5–2, resulting in the club securing promotion into the Bundesliga. Two weeks later on 24 May 2009 in the last game of the season, Schwaab scored his sixth goal of the season, in a 4–3 win against 1. FC Kaiserslautern. At the end of the 2008–09 season, he went on to make thirty–five appearances and scoring six times in all competitions.

Bayer Leverkusen

During the 2008–09 season, with his Freiburg contract running out it was announced that Schwaab was to join top flight side Bayer Leverkusen. He had been previously linked with a move to the club a year prior to that. The outcome saw Bayer Leverkusen paying Freiburg €250,000 for the player, in turn being able to sign the player earlier.

Schwaab made his debut for the club, starting the whole game in the right–back position, and kept a clean sheet, in a 1–0 win against SV Babelsberg 03 in the first round of the DFB-Pokal. In a follow–up match, he made his Bundesliga debut, starting the whole game, in a 2–2 draw against Mainz 05 in the opening game of the 2009–10 season on 8 August 2009. After appearing in the next three matches, coming from the substitute bench, Schwaab suffered an injury that saw him miss two matches. He returned to the starting line–up against 1. FC Köln on 26 September 2009 and helped Bayer Leverkusen keep a clean sheet, in a 1–0 win. This was followed up by helping the club keep a clean sheet in the next two matches. Since returning from injury, Schwaab established himself in the first team, playing in the right-back position. He then provided an assist by setting up a goal for Eren Derdiyok, who scored Bayer Leverkusen's second goal of the game, in a 4–2 win over Hamburger SV on 14 March 2010. However, during a 3–2 loss against Eintracht Frankfurt on 1 April 2010, Schwaab was sent–off in the 49th minute for a foul on Ümit Korkmaz. After the match, the club unsuccessfully appealed against his suspension and Schwaab have to serve a three match suspension. After serving a three match suspension, he returned to the starting line–up against Borussia Mönchengladbach and helped Bayer Leverkusen draw 1–1, resulting in the club qualifying for the UEFA Europa League next season. At the end of the 2009–10 season, Schwaab went on to make thirty appearances in all competitions.

At the start of the 2010–11 season, Schwaab started the season well when he set up two goals, in an 11–1 win over Pirmasens in the first round of the DFB-Pokal. Schwaab played in both legs of the UEFA Europa League Play–off rounds against Tavriya Simferopol, beating them 6–1 on aggregate and resulting in Bayer Leverkusen going through to the group stage. In a match against Rosenberg in the UEFA Europa League on 16 September 2010, he set up a goal for Patrick Helmes, who went on to score a hat–trick, in a 4–0 win. Schwaab continued to be a first team regular, rotating in playing in the right–back position and centre–back position. He then helped the club keep four consecutive clean sheets in four matches between 5 March 2011 and 2 April 2011. However, Bayer Leverkusen went on to finish second place in the league after beating his former club, SC Freiburg in the last game of the season. At the end of the 2010–11 season, Schwaab went on to make forty appearances in all competitions.

Ahead of the 2011–12 season, Schwaab was given all-clear after he suffered a muscular problems. At the start of the 2011–12 season, Schwaab made three starts for Bayer Leverkusen, playing in either the left–back position and right–back position. However, he suffered a knee injury that saw him miss one match. Schwaab made his return to the first team, coming on as a 72nd-minute substitute, in a 3–1 win over Wolfsburg on 1 October 2011. Two weeks later on 19 October 2011, he made his UEFA Champions League debut, coming on as a late substitute, in a 2–1 win against Valencia. Since returning from injury, Schwaab regained his first team, playing in either the centre–back position and right–back position, as the season progressed. However, he suffered a shinbone injury that kept him out for the rest of the 2011–12 season. At the end of the 2011–12 season, Schwaab finished the season making twenty-eight appearances in all competitions.

Ahead of the 2012–13 season, Schwaab continued to rehabilitate from the shinbone injury throughout the summer. He made his first appearance of the season against Carl Zeiss Jena in the first round of DFB Pokal and set up Bayer Leverkusen's third goal of the game, in a 4–0 win. However, he found himself competing with new signing Dani Carvajal over the right-back position and was demoted to the substitute bench as a result. Schwaab also suffered an ankle injury during a match against Arminia Bielefeld in the second round of the DFB–Pokal and was substituted in the 42nd minute, as the club won 3–2 on 31 October 2012. After the match, he was eventually sidelined for the next three months. Schwaab made his first team return from injury as a centre-back, in a 3–3 draw against Borussia Mönchengladbach on 9 February 2013. Following his return from injury, he was given a handful of first team appearances as a centre-back for the rest of the 2012–13 season following Ömer Toprak's injury. At the end of the 2012–13 season, Schwaab went on to make twenty–two appearances in all competitions.

VfB Stuttgart
At the end of his contract with Bayer Leverkusen on 1 July 2013, Schwaab moved to VfB Stuttgart on a free transfer on 8 May 2013, signing a contract until June 2016.

He made his debut for the club in the first leg of the UEFA Europa League third round against Botev Plovdiv and started the whole game, in a 1–1 draw. In the return leg, Schwaab started the whole game, once again, and helped Stuttgart keep a clean sheet, in a 0–0 draw, resulting in the club going through to the next round. He made his league debut for Stuttgart,  starting the whole game in the right–back position, in a 3–2 loss against Mainz 05 in the opening game of the 2013–14 season. In a follow–up against his former club, Bayer Leverkusen, however, Schwaab scored an own goal that saw Stuttgart lose 1–0. He then set up a goal for Martin Harnik in a 1–1 draw against Werder Bremen on 5 October 2013. Since joining the club, Schwaab quickly became a first team regular, rotating in playing either the centre–back position and right–back position despite Stuttgart's poor performances. Since the start of the 2013–14 season, he appeared in every match until missing one match due to a knee injury. But Schwaab returned to the starting line–up against Mainz 05 on 25 January 2014 and started the whole game, as the club lost 2–1. Following his return from injury, he regained his first team place, playing in either the centre–back and right–back position. However, Schwaab suffered an ankle injury that saw him sidelined for the rest of the 2013–14 season. At the end of the 2013–14 season, he went on to make thirty–eight appearances in all competitions.

Ahead of the 2014–15 season, Schwaab managed to recover from his injury and was featured in Stuttgart's pre–season tour. At the start of the 2014–15 season, he continued to regain his first team place, rotating in playing in either centre–back position and right–back position. However, the start to the season saw the club make a poor start, which saw them at the relegation. Schwaab then scored his first goal for Stuttgart on 27 September 2014 in a 1–0 win over Hannover 96, giving the club its first win of the season. During a 2–0 loss against Werder Bremen on 5 November 2014, he suffered ankle injury and was substituted in the 65th minute. But Schwaab recovered and returned to the starting line–up against Augsburg on 23 November 2014 and was sent–off for a second bookable offence, in a 1–0 loss. After serving a one match suspension, he returned to the first team, coming on as a 31st-minute substitute against Schalke 04 on 6 December 2014, as Stuttgart lost 4–0. Following his return from suspension, Schwaab regained his first team place, once again, playing in either right-back or centre-back position. However,  he suffered an ankle injury that saw him miss one match. But Schwaab was able to make a return to the first team, coming on as an 86th-minute substitute against Werder Bremen on 12 April 2015 and helped the club win 3–2. His first team run ins since returning from injury saw him help Stuttgart avoid relegation. At the end of the 2014–15 season, he went on to make 32 appearances and scoring once in all competitions.

In the 2015–16 season, Schwaab appeared three times in the first two months to the season, as he competed with Florian Klein over the right-back position and this saw him placed on the substitute bench. By October, Schwaab regained his first team place, where he played three times in the defensive midfield position. Schwaab then began rotating in playing either the centre–back and right–back position for the rest of the 2015–16 season. However, VfB Stuttgart were relegated after a miserable start of the campaign under coach Alexander Zorniger after losing 3–1 to Wolfsburg on 14 May 2016. At the end of the 2015–16 season, he went on to make thirty–two appearances in all competitions. Following this, Schwaab was released by the club after they decided against offering him a contract.

PSV Eindhoven
After leaving Stuttgart, Schwaab moved to Eredivisie's champion PSV Eindhoven on a free transfer, signing a three-year contract on 11 July 2016. Upon joining the club, he was given a number five shirt ahead of the new season.

Schwaab started on his PSV Eindhoven debut and played the whole game in a 1–0 win over Feyenoord in the Johan Cruyff Shield. He then made his league debut for the club, in the opening game of the season, in a 2–1 win over Utrecht. Since joining PSV Eindhoven, Schwaab found himself in and out of the first team, fighting for his place in the centre–back position, due to competitions. At times, he rotated into playing in the defensive midfield position. Schwaab's performances in playing in the defensive midfield role was praised by manager Phillip Cocu, saying: "I thought Daniel played an excellent game. He stayed calm, played ahead, won his duels and took his responsibility. If you have to play in a place that you are not used to playing there and you fill it in like that, then that class." By December, Schwaab regained his first team place and was featured in a number of matches, playing in the centre–back position. He helped the club keep two clean sheets in two matches between 3 December 2016 and 10 December 2016. As the 2016–17 season progressed, Schwaab continued to find himself rotating in and out of the starting line–up, which saw him placed on the substitute bench. At the end of the 2016–17 season, he went on to make thirty–one appearances in all competitions.

In the opening game of the 2017–18 season, Schwaab started the season well when he set up PSV Eindhoven's second goal of the game, in a 3–2 win against AZ Alkmaar. After being dropped to the substitute bench for the next three matches, Schwaab returned to the starting line–up against Feyenoord on 17 September 2017 and helped the club keep a clean sheet, in a 1–0 to maintain a perfect start at the top of the table. Following this, he regained his first team place, playing in the centre–back position. He then helped PSV Eindhoven go on a ten consecutive victories in a row between 17 September 2017 and 3 December 2017. During which, Schwaab scored his first goal for the club, in a 5–2 win against VVV-Venlo on 15 October 2017. He then scored his second goal for PSV Eindhoven, in a 2–1 win against Vitesse on 23 December 2017. He helped the club keep three clean sheets in three matches between 27 January 2018 and 7 February 2018. Schwaab started in the centre–back position on 15 April 2018, as PSV Eindhoven beat rivals Ajax 3–0 to clinch the Eredivise title. After the match, his performances was praised by Piet de Visser, Huub Stevens and Jan Peters. At the end of the 2017–18 season, he went on to make thirty–six appearances and scoring two times in all competitions. During the season, his contributions and influence to PSV Eindhoven's team were praised by teammate Steven Bergwijn and manager Cocu. Schwaab was also named the league's Team of the Season.

At the start of the 2018–19 season, Schwaab made his first appearance of the season against Feyenoord in the Johan Cruyff Shield and started the whole game throughout 120 minutes, as PSV Eindhoven lost 6–5 on penalties. He helped the club got off to a good start to the season, including qualifying for the UEFA Champions League Group Stage after beating Bate Borisov 6–3 on aggregate and saw the side on a winning streak, resulting in them at the top of the table. Schwaab helped PSV Eindhoven keep four clean sheets out of the five matches between 15 September 2018 and 20 October 2018, including a 3–0 win over rivals, Ajax. After missing one match, he returned to the starting line–up against FC Emmen on 20 October 2018 and helped the club keep a clean sheet, in a 6–0 win. After missing two matches, due to being given a special leave, Schwaab then scored his first goal of the season, in a 4–0 win against Heracles Almelo on 15 December 2018. After missing one match, he returned to the starting line–up against FC Emmen on 20 January 2019, as PSV Eindoven drew 2–2. Schwaab then helped the club keep three clean sheets in three matches between 3 March 2019 and 17 March 2019. In a match against rivals Ajax on 31 March 2019, he was at fault for scoring an own goal and gave away a penalty, in a 3–1 loss. After the match, Schwaab acknowledged his faults for his performance and vowed to help the club maintain their title chase. He made his 100th appearance for PSV Eindhoven against PEC Zwolle on 4 April 2019 and started the whole game, as the club won 4–1. However, Schwaab was unable to help PSV Eindhoven defend the league title after surrendering it to their rivals, Ajax. Throughout the 2018–19 season, Schwaab continued to establish himself in the first team, playing in the centre–back position. At the end of the 2018–19 season, he went on to make thirty–nine appearances and scoring once in all competitions.

During the 2018–19 season, the club began talks with Schwaab over a new contract on three separate occasions. It was announced on 14 May 2019 that he decided not to renew his contract with PSV Eindhoven and wanted to be able to return to Germany and live closer to his family. After leaving the club, Schwaab reflected on his time at PSV Eindhoven, saying: "If you want to write a book, you do it that way. That was also the best moment of my career. If you don't get a prize, it's not a good season. We played very well in the first half of the season, with a great idea. The second half of the season was sometimes a bit more difficult, it was no longer automatic. And we had to work hard."

PSV Eindhoven (second spell)
Following his release by PSV Eindhoven, Schwaab returned to Germany and went on trial at his former clubs, SV Waldkirch and SC Freiburg, in order to maintain his fitness. But on 11 August 2019, he re-joined PSV Eindhoven on a one-year deal. It came after when the agreement between SC Freiburg and the player didn't materialised. Explaining re–joining the club, Schwaab said: "I wanted to be closer to my family. My eldest son goes to school in Germany. Now my family is here on vacation. When the vacation is over, everyone goes back. I needed time to recharge, to get a good feeling with my family. That good feeling is back. I can go again and they can solve it at home without me."

His first game after signing for the club on a permanent basis came on 29 August 2019 against Apollon Limassol in the second leg of the UEFA Europa League Play–off round coming on in the 81st minute, and helped PSV Eindhoven win 4–0 to advance to the next round. Since re–joining the club, he found himself placed on the substitute bench in the first two months. By October, Schwaab regained his first team place, playing in the centre–back position. He then scored his first goal since returning to the club, scoring from a penalty in a 4–1 loss against LASK on 7 November 2019 in a UEFA Europa League match. Three weeks later on 1 December 2019, Schwaab scored his second goal for PSV Eindhoven, in a 1–1 draw against FC Emmen. Schwaab continued as a first-team regular, making twenty–foue appearances and scoring two times in all competitions before the 2019–20 Eredivisie halted in the Netherlands on 12 March 2020 due to the pandemic, which the season was eventually cancelled.

Following this, PSV Eindhoven announced on 28 March 2020 that he was among eight players to not have their contract renewed at the end of the 2019–20 season. However, on 20 May 2020, the club immediately terminated Schwaab's contract to allow him to return to Germany. After leaving the club, he spoke in an interview with Eindhoven Dagblad, saying: "I cherish this period of four years for the rest of my life. Not only because I won something with the club, but also because beautiful and sincere friendships have been made and I felt respect here. I could and was allowed to be who I am here. The fact that I made the choice to come to Eindhoven in 2016 was the best I could have done. The 2018 championship will be a highlight forever. I will never forget that season (2017-2018, ed.). It was really together, and then really real. Together with the players, supporters, with the trainers and the rest of the club. Becoming champion in your own stadium against Ajax, your biggest rival, that's the best thing there is. Two years before that I had been relegated in Germany, but PSV somehow gave me something extra. I was able to do more than before, felt confident and in 2018 I had the very best year of my career. Because of my period at PSV my career has been successful."

International career

On 30 January 2006, Schwaab made his Germany U18 debut, starting a match and played 76 minutes before being substituted, in a 5–1 loss against Finland U18. He later made three more appearances for the U18 national team. On 5 September 2006, Schwaab made his Germany U19 debut, starting the whole game, in a 1–0 win against Austria U19. He then scored his first goal for the U19 national team, in a 7–2 win against Estonia U19 on 30 October 2006. In July 2007, Schwaab was called up to the Germany U19 squad for the UEFA European Under-19 Championship in Austria. He later played three times in the tournament, as the U19 national team were eliminated in the semi–finals.

Following the tournament, Schwaab was called up to the U21 for the first time on 21 August 2007. He made his debut for the U21 national team, starting the whole game, in a 2–2 draw against Republic of Ireland U21. Schwaab then helped Germany U21 keep three clean sheets between 16 October 2007 and 20 November 2007. He played in both legs of the UEFA European Under-21 Championship qualification against France U21, as the U21 national team won 2–1 on aggregate. In May 2009, Schwaab was selected for the 2009 European Championship by Germany U21. Having appeared as an unused substitute throughout the tournament, he made only one appearance as a substitute during the final against England Y21 on 29 June 2009 and helped the U21 national team win 4–0 to win the tournament. Following the end of the tournament, Schwaab became first choice defender for Germany U21 in the new qualifying campaign matches. He then scored his first U21 national team goal, in an 11–0 win over San Marino U21 on 17 November 2009. Schwaab later made two more appearances for Germany U21, playing in both matches against Iceland U21 in 2010. He went on to make twenty–four appearances and scoring once for the U21 national team in all competitions.

Post–playing career
Schwaab announced his retirement from playing in October 2020, and began a work placement at former SC Freiburg. PSV Eindhoven previously offered the player a job as a trainer but he turned it down. In August 2022, Freiburg's website revealed that Schwaab was working as a youth coach at the club.

Personal life
Schwaab grew up supporting SC Freiburg, later revealing he had slept in club-branded bedclothes as a child, eventually playing for them as he reached his adulthood. He said his favorite subject in school were Sports, Maths and Physics. He later graduated in economics at Fernuni Hagen.

In December 2011, Schwaab married his long–term girlfriend, Lisa, a teacher, and together. They have two children.

Honours
PSV Eindhoven
Eredivisie: 2017–18
Johan Cruyff Shield: 2016

Germany U21
 UEFA European Under-21 Championship: 2009

References

External links
 
  
 

1988 births
Living people
German footballers
German expatriate footballers
Footballers from Baden-Württemberg
Association football defenders
Bundesliga players
SC Freiburg players
Bayer 04 Leverkusen players
Bayer 04 Leverkusen II players
VfB Stuttgart players
Eredivisie players
PSV Eindhoven players
Germany under-21 international footballers
Germany youth international footballers
German expatriate sportspeople in the Netherlands
Expatriate footballers in the Netherlands